Tamar Geller is a dog trainer, a behavior expert, and a New York Times bestselling author who developed '"The Loved Dog" method of dog training. Known for her innovative method that is based in the intersection of brain science, personal development, and deep understanding of dogs' behavior, which made her popular with celebrity clientele such as Oprah, Lady Gaga, the Kardashians, Tony Robbins, Reese Witherspoon, Mark Wahlberg, Brad Paisley and many others.  Oprah called Tamar “Life coach for dogs and their people" as Tamar has transformed lives and impacted relationships not only for dogs, but also for the people who love them.  

After serving as an intelligence officer working with the Israeli Special Forces, she spent time to observing wolves in the wild and studying the role of the leader as a parent and protector of his pack.  By using similar techniques as the wolves, she created a method of training puppies that does not involve aggression, dominance, or choke chains. Tamar’s method goes beyond positive reinforcement as she emphasizes building a solid relationship with the dog based on understanding the dog as the individual that s/he is and coaching them through games and fun to become the best version of themselves.  She strongly opposes the training methods that want a dog to be submissive. Tamar believes in helping PAWrents empower their dog to be the best s/he could be and build a relationship that is based on mutual devotion and love. She is the founder of the first cage-free doggy boarding and day care center in southern California, called The Loved Dog. Her first book of the same name teaches dog-owners how to train their dogs in a nonaggressive way.

Among other things, Geller works closely with the animal rights organizations Humane Society of the United States, American Society for the Prevention of Cruelty to Animals, Best Friends Animal Society, Helen Woodward Animal Center, and various rescue organizations. She conducts speeches and programs for rescue organizations, and has given lectures about her expertise in dog behavior at Cal-Poly University Veterinary school and at Pepperdine University.

She has appeared on various television programs and media outlets, including The Today Show, Oprah, Ellen, The Kardashians,  Animal Planet, CNN, Entertainment Tonight, Access Hollywood, Extra, Insider, HLN, Fox News, CNN, HGTV, TLC, Bravo,20/20, New York Times, Hollywood Reporter, Newsweek, People, USA Today, US Weekly, Travel + Leisure,  Reporter and Men's Health.

The Loved Dog
Tamar created The Loved Dog™ method over 30 years ago based on the knowledge she acquired as an intelligence officer in the Israeli Special Forces, from the time she spent observing wolves in the wild, and from personal/spiritual development work.
She rejects the popular concept of teaching dogs to obey five commands, and instead teaches dogs essential life skills that they need to succeed in our human society. Tamar believes the key is to empower them to know how to self regulate impulses especially when triggered, and make good decisions, in the same way human toddlers are taught to do the same. Tamar and The Loved Dog™ method builds a relationship based on love and devotion that goes both ways. Learning through fun games, clear communication and mutual respect. Rejecting the painful collars, choke chains, and shock collars that have been common tools of dog trainers for decades, Tamar honors the wisdom and greatness of dogs and educates with kindness and compassion. 
This is the only training method endorsed by The Humane Society of the United States.

Philanthropy
Driven by her desire to improve the lives of people and animals in need by nurturing the power of dogs’ healing power, Tamar founded The Loved World Foundation by Tamar Geller. With her background as a former intelligence officer in the Israeli Special Forces and understanding first-hand the challenges of being a veteran, she created the Operation Heroes & Hounds™ program. The program was established in 2007 to aid injured members of the United States military suffering from physical and non-visible wounds. She also created “Another Chance for Love” which helps juvenile prisoners develop self-esteem and life skills by lovingly and compassionately coaching the shelter dogs with The Loved Dog™ method.

Published works
 
 
 Celebrate Your Dog! The Loved Dog Way of Training (DVD), 2007

References

External links
Official website
The Loved Dog website
Facebook page

Year of birth missing (living people)
Living people
Dog trainers
American animal care and training writers
Israeli animal care and training writers
American people of Israeli descent
Pepperdine University faculty